Oskar Allmann (born 1868) was a German trade unionist.

Allmann worked as a baker, and joined the Union of Bakers and Related Workers of Germany.  In 1895, he was elected as president of the union.  In 1907, he took the union into a merger which formed the Central Union of Bakers and Confectioners, remaining president of the new union.  That year, he also led the formation of the International Federation of Bakers, Pastry Cooks and Allied Workers' Associations, becoming its general secretary.

Allmann stood down from his trade union posts in 1918, but remained involved with the trade union movement, and in 1930, his Geschichte der deutschen Bäcker- und Konditoren-bewegung was published.

References

1868 births
Year of death missing
German trade union leaders
19th-century German people
20th-century German people